Karl-Andreas Kalmet (born on 8 February 1989) is an Estonian actor.

Kalmet's parents are actor and director Madis Kalmet and diplomat and former actress Gita Kalmet (née Ränk).

In 2008, he graduated from British School in The Netherlands in The Hague and in 2012 as an actor at from the Estonian Academy of Music and Theatre's Performing Arts Department. Then, until 2015, he worked as an actor at the Tallinn City Theatre. In 2012 he co-hosted for the TV3 television series Eesti otsib superstaari with his older brother, actor Henrik Kalmet.

He is an attacker in football club Tallinna FC Reaal.

Filmography
 1944 (2015)
 The Days That Confused (2016)
 The Dissidents (2017)

References

1989 births
Living people
Estonian male film actors
Estonian television presenters
21st-century Estonian male actors
Estonian Academy of Music and Theatre alumni
Estonian footballers
Association footballers not categorized by position